In Greek mythology, Eteoneus (Ancient Greek: Ἐτεωνεύς) may refer to various characters:

 Eteoneus, son of Boethous, son of Argeius (son of Pelops) and Hegesandre (daughter of King Amyclas). He helped Odysseus in his trials getting back home. During the Trojan War, he was the weapon-carrier of Spartan king Menelaus.
 Eteoneus, one of the Suitors of Penelope who came from Same along with other 22 wooers. He, with the other suitors, was shot dead by Odysseus with the assistance of Eumaeus, Philoetius, and Telemachus.

See also 
 12916 Eteoneus, Jovian asteroid
 List of Greek mythological figures

Notes

References 

 Apollodorus, The Library with an English Translation by Sir James George Frazer, F.B.A., F.R.S. in 2 Volumes, Cambridge, MA, Harvard University Press; London, William Heinemann Ltd. 1921. ISBN 0-674-99135-4. Online version at the Perseus Digital Library. Greek text available from the same website.
Homer, The Odyssey with an English Translation by A.T. Murray, PH.D. in two volumes. Cambridge, MA., Harvard University Press; London, William Heinemann, Ltd. 1919. . Online version at the Perseus Digital Library. Greek text available from the same website.

Achaeans (Homer)

Characters in the Odyssey
Suitors of Penelope